Youth is the second Japanese-language studio album by South Korean boy band BTS, which was released on September 7, 2016, through Pony Canyon. The album features 13 tracks.

Editions
Both versions have the complete track listing and a photocard came with all first edition albums.
 Album + DVD edition (PCCA-4434): This edition comes with a DVD containing "For You", "I Need You (Japanese version)", and "Run (Japanese version)" music videos.
Regular edition (PCCA-4435): N/A

Commercial performance
Youth sold 44,547 copies on its release day and topped the daily issue of the Oricon Albums Chart for September 6, 2016. It went on to sell 76,483 copies during the tracking period dated September 5–11, and debuted atop the subsequent weekly issue of the chart dated September 19. The album entered the September monthly chart at number four, with 81,763 cumulative sales, and was certified gold by the Recording Industry Association of Japan (RIAJ) shortly afterwards, denoting 100,000 physical copies sold. It was the 48th best-selling album of the year in Japan per Oricon's annual album chart for 2016.

Track listing

Certifications

Release history

References

External links
 
 
 

2016 albums
BTS albums
Japanese-language albums
Pony Canyon albums
Hybe Corporation albums